Bedford Avenue is the longest street in Brooklyn, New York City, stretching  and 132 blocks, from Manhattan Avenue in Greenpoint south to Emmons Avenue in Sheepshead Bay, and passing through the neighborhoods of Williamsburg, Bedford-Stuyvesant, Crown Heights, Flatbush, Midwood, Marine Park, and Sheepshead Bay.

History 
Bedford Road, passing through Bedford Pass, was an important north-south route in the 18th century for traffic between the farming village of Flatbush and the headwaters of Newtown Creek. In the 19th century, it was extended south to the shore, and late in the century, it became one of the earliest paved roads in the rapidly growing eastern suburbs of the City of Brooklyn.

Bedford Avenue is an amalgam of various historical roads. For example, in Williamsburg, Bedford Avenue was known as Fourth Street in the late 1800's.

Transportation 
Automobile traffic flows in two directions: south of Grant Square, at Dean Street; and one-way northbound north of that location. The northernmost block of Bedford Avenue, between the intersections of Lorimer Street/Nassau Avenue and Manhattan Avenue in Greenpoint, was formerly bi-directional. In July 2018, this block was made one-way eastbound, with all traffic on northbound Bedford Avenue being forced to turn onto eastbound Nassau Avenue, at the Lorimer Street intersection.

Northbound and southbound bicycle lanes are painted on the avenue south of Grant Square. There are two New York City Subway stations named after the avenue: the Bedford Avenue station at Bedford Avenue and North 7th Street in Williamsburg; and the Bedford–Nostrand Avenues station at Bedford Avenue and Lafayette Avenue in Bedford-Stuyvesant. Additionally, while not named after the avenue, the Nostrand Avenue station has entrances on Bedford Avenue. The B44 bus runs on a large part of the avenue.

Buildings 
The many different building types common in Brooklyn are evident at some point on the avenue, from attached and detached single-family houses in Sheepshead Bay and Midwood, to brownstone rowhouses in Crown Heights and Bedford-Stuyvesant and apartment buildings in Williamsburg and Greenpoint. In addition, the avenue passes through neighborhoods representative of Brooklyn's cultural and ethnic diversity. African-American, Caribbean, West African, Hasidic, Latin American, Russian, and Polish neighborhoods are all found along the avenue.

Designated landmarks include the Studebaker Building and the 23rd Regiment Armory.

References

Streets in Brooklyn